Leone Strozzi, O.S.B. (1638–1703) was a Roman Catholic prelate who served as Archbishop of Florence (1700–1703) and Bishop of Pistoia e Prato (1690–1700).

Biography
Leone Strozzi was born in Florence, Italy in 1638 and ordained a priest in the Order of Saint Benedict. On 10 July 1690, he was appointed during the papacy of Pope Alexander VIII as Bishop of Pistoia e Prato. On 6 August 1690, he was consecrated bishop by Paluzzo Paluzzi Altieri Degli Albertoni, Cardinal-Bishop of Sabina, with Prospero Bottini, Titular Archbishop of Myra, and Nicolò d'Arcano, Bishop of Comacchio, serving as co-consecrators. On 21 June 1700, he was appointed during the papacy of List of popes as Archbishop of Florence. He served as Archbishop of Florence until his death on 4 October 1703.

References

17th-century Italian Roman Catholic archbishops
18th-century Italian Roman Catholic archbishops
Bishops appointed by Pope Alexander VIII
1638 births
1703 deaths